Johnny Nitro may refer to:

 John Morrison (wrestler) (born 1979), American professional wrestler, actor, and traceur
 Johnny Nitro (musician), American blues vocalist, guitarist, and band leader